The 2022 Women’s European Boxing Championships were held in the Budva, Montenegro from 14 to 22 October 2022.

Schedule

Medal table

Medal winners

Participating nations 
154 boxers from 30 countries registered to compete at the 2022 European Championships.

References

External links
Results book

Women's European Amateur Boxing Championships
2022
European Amateur Boxing Championships
Boxing
Boxing
European
Sport in Budva